Boyd Payne Gaines (born May 11, 1953) is an American actor. During his career, he has won four Tony Awards and three Drama Desk Awards. Gaines is best known for playing Mark Royer on One Day at a Time (1981-1984).

Early life and education
He was born in Atlanta, Georgia, to James and Ida Gaines. His early theatre training began at the Pacific Conservatory of the Performing Arts at Allan Hancock College in Santa Maria, California, where his talent and rich baritone voice were showcased in leading roles in plays, musicals, and opera. He attended the Juilliard School as a member of the Drama Division's Group 8 (1975–1979).

Career
Gaines has appeared in a number of films and television shows, including Fame, Frasier, L.A. Law, Law & Order, and Piece of Cake, but his most notable television role was as Mark Royer, who married Valerie Bertinelli's Barbara Cooper on TV's One Day at a Time. Gaines appeared in the final three seasons of the show. He also portrayed Coach Brackett in the 1981 movie Porky's, Lt. Ring in the 1986 film Heartbreak Ridge and Jason in The Sure Thing (1985).

Gaines is a voice actor, and is credited with recording several audiobooks.

He has appeared on the Broadway stage, in both musicals and plays, for which he has won four Tony Awards. His first Broadway play was The Heidi Chronicles in 1989. He has appeared in the musicals She Loves Me (1993), Company (1995), and Contact (2000). Other plays have included the 2010 revival of Driving Miss Daisy, The Columnist (2012), and the Broadway revival of An Enemy of the People in 2012. He appeared in the 2008 revival of Gypsy as Herbie, and won the Tony Award for Best Featured Actor in a Musical.

He has appeared Off-Broadway, starting in 1978 with Spring Awakening and recently The Grand Manner by A. R. Gurney at Lincoln Center in 2010.

In regional theatre, Gaines appeared in Our Town at the George Street Playhouse, New Jersey, in April 2014.

Awards and nominations
Gaines was nominated for a Tony Award for Best Performance by a Leading Actor in a Play in 2007, for Journey's End, making him the first actor to be nominated in each of the four Tony categories for which an actor is eligible. Only two male and three female performers have been nominated for all four Tony performance awards, the others being Raúl Esparza, Angela Lansbury, Jan Maxwell, and Audra McDonald. Gaines was the first performer to be nominated for each of Best Featured Actor in a Play in 1989 for The Heidi Chronicles, Best Actor in a Musical in 1994 for She Loves Me, Best Featured Actor in a Musical in 2000 for Contact and again in 2008 for Gypsy, and Best Actor in a Play in 2007 for Journey's End. Gaines won in three of the categories (and four of the five nominations), missing only for the performance in Journey's End. His four wins are for The Heidi Chronicles, She Loves Me, Contact, and Gypsy.

Personal
He is married to Kathleen McNenny. They have one daughter.

Filmography

Stage productions

References

Sources

External links
 
 
 

1953 births
Living people
American male film actors
American male musical theatre actors
American male stage actors
American male television actors
American male voice actors
Audiobook narrators
Drama Desk Award winners
Juilliard School alumni
Theatre World Award winners
Tony Award winners
Male actors from Atlanta
20th-century American male actors
21st-century American male actors